The Naval Live Oaks Cemetery (also known as the Head Site and 8SR36) is a prehistoric cemetery associated with the Pensacola culture, a regional variant of the Mississippian culture. It is located near Gulf Breeze, Florida. On September 28, 1998, it was added to the U.S. National Register of Historic Places.

References

External links
 Santa Rosa County listings at National Register of Historic Places

Pensacola culture
National Register of Historic Places in Santa Rosa County, Florida
Protected areas of Santa Rosa County, Florida